Jack Daniels (December 24, 1906 – July 15, 1977) was an American football running back who played one game for the Milwaukee Badgers in 1925. He died at age 70 in 1977. He was 135 pounds, making him one of the lightest NFL players in history. He was also 19 when he played his first game, which makes him one of the youngest NFL players in history.

References

1906 births
1977 deaths
Milwaukee Badgers players